Air Slovakia was an airline based in Bratislava, Slovakia, operating out of M. R. Štefánik Airport. The airline offered scheduled and chartered passenger flights, as well as aircraft lease (ACMI).

History 

The airline was established on 2 June 1993 as Air Terrex, with its first revenue flight (from Bratislava to Tel Aviv) taking place in January 1994.  The new name Air Slovakia was adopted in 1995, following the re-positioning of the airline after the Dissolution of Czechoslovakia.

In October 2006 the airline was sold by Indian businessman Ninder Singh Chohan and purchased by Indian businessman Harjinder Singh Sidhu, who aimed at focussing the airline towards his home country, launching several new destinations.

On 2 March 2010, Air Slovakia had its AOC removed by Slovak authorities with immediate effect, which led to the airline being dissolved in June 2010.

Destinations 

Over its time of existence, Air Slovakia operated an extensive network of charter flights, most of them to the Mediterranean region, but also to the Seychelles, Bangladesh, Sri Lanka and Thailand. Destinations that saw scheduled flights included Amritsar, Goa and New Delhi in India, as well as Beirut, Dubai, Kuwait and Tel Aviv. Air Slovakia once also offered some intra-European scheduled flights (to Barcelona, Birmingham, Cologne, Larnaca, London and Milan).

Upon closure, Air Slovakia served the following destinations:

Asia
India
Amritsar - Raja Sansi International Airport
Bangladesh
Dhaka - Shahjalal International Airport

Europe
Italy
Bergamo - Orio al Serio Airport
Slovakia
Bratislava - M. R. Štefánik Airport Base
Spain
Barcelona - Barcelona El Prat Airport
United Kingdom
Birmingham - Birmingham International Airport

Fleet 
The ageing Boeing 727 aircraft that formed the initial Air Slovakia fleet were replaced with Boeing 737-200 in 1999, and later again with the more modern Boeing 737-300 (from 2007) and Boeing 757-200 (from 2003).

Upon closure, the Air Slovakia fleet consisted of the following aircraft, equipped with an all-economy class seating:

On 2 March 2010, the average age of the Air Slovakia fleet was 22.9 years.

References

External links
Official website 

Defunct airlines of Slovakia
Airlines established in 1994
Airlines disestablished in 2010
2010 disestablishments in Slovakia
Slovakian companies established in 1994